Lasiognathus saccostoma is a species of wolftrap angler known from the eastern central Pacific Ocean and tropical waters of the Atlantic Ocean. The females of this species grow to a length of  SL. This species has a slender, compressed prolongation at the tip of its elongated, cylindrical distal escal appendage, with numerous lateral serrations and distal filaments. Unlike in L. amphirhamphus, there are three escal hooks and they are darkly pigmented. The posterior escal appendage is broad and laterally compressed, and relatively larger than in L. amphirhamphus. No males or larval specimens have ever been found.

References
 

Thaumatichthyidae
Fish described in 1925